Title 39 of the United States Code outlines the role of United States Postal Service in the United States Code.

 Part I—General
 Part II—Personnel
 Part III—Modernization and Fiscal Administration
 Part IV—Mail Matter
 Part V—Transportation of Mail

External links 
U.S. Code Title 39, via United States Government Printing Office
U.S. Code Title 39, via Cornell University

References
 

39
Title 39